Rob'n'Raz were a Swedish music duo of Robert Wåtz and Rasmus Lindwall.

After some years of DJing in the late 1980s, they decided to start performing and composing together. They worked on production, remixing and scratching. For a time, Lindwall was the first choice when a Swedish recording demanded a scratch.

Leila K and Papa Dee were among the vocalists and rappers during the first years when the records were released by Swemix. They had two chart appearances in the UK Singles Chart with "Got to Get" (1989, #8) and "Rok the Nation" (1990, #41). In 1990, they released the album Rob'n'Raz featuring Leila K, which included those two songs.

Remixes were produced with Just D and Christer Sandelin. They produced a large number of unofficial remixes released by Remixed Records, such as ABBA's "Dancing Queen" among others. They also composed the music for the video game Safecracker (1996).

During 1993, on ZTV, they presented the dance/hip hop section Clubhopping. Later the same year, they released an album with the same name under the name Rob'n'Raz DLC with rapper David "D-Flex" Seisay and vocalist Lutricia McNeal. 'DLC' was short for 'David and Lutricia Combination'.

In the early 2000s, they appeared as judges on the TV4 musical show Småstjärnorna.

Singles

References

External links
Rob 'N' Raz Discography at Discogs
Official homepage

Swedish musical duos
Swedish dance music groups